The Isle College, Wisbech, Cambridgeshire, opened in 1956 as the Isle of Ely Further Education College and Horticultural Institute. In 1983, it became a tertiary education college. In 1987, its horticultural institute separated to become part of the Cambridgeshire College of Agriculture and Horticulture. In 2006, the Isle College was dissolved and merged with The College of West Anglia to become the expanded college's "Isle Campus".

History 
In 1954, the Isle of Ely County Council authorised the building of a new college for "the provision of further education for all the young people of this county, similar to that already enjoyed by adolescents in other areas." The first students entered the college in 1956.

According to its own promotional material, in the late 1980s the college offered 750 full time study places.

In 1994, the Further Education Funding Council inspectorate wrote: "Its provision is mainly designed for school leavers.  There is an extensive range of full-time courses in art and design, substantial provision in business studies and a broad range of GCE A level courses.  The college has made limited progress in expanding the range of its provision to meet the requirements of adults, those in employment and those without formal entry qualifications." The college's main catchment was Fenland district, south Lincolnshire and west Norfolk. The main feeder schools were Queens School, Wisbech, and the three Cambridgeshire community colleges, Cromwell, Sir Harry Smith and Neale Wade.

Dissolution and merger 
On 1 April 2006, Isle College was dissolved and merged with the College of West Anglia, based in King's Lynn. The colleges voted to merge with the intention of attracting more capital investment, though there was speculation at the time that the Wisbech campus would be closed and a new campus developed in March.

In 2012, the remaining land-based part of the college provision was moved to College of West Anglia's campus in Milton, Cambridge. This was blamed by some on government cutbacks.

College principals 
The principals of Isle College have included: 

H. R. Bailey (from its foundation)
Harry Jones (1978 to 1993)
Mark Taylor (to 2006 and merger)

Former students 
Some former students of the college's land-based courses have become National Trust head gardeners, zookeepers and to work for government agencies, such as the Environment Agency and English Nature.

References 

Further education colleges in Norfolk
1956 establishments in England
Educational institutions established in 1956
Wisbech